The Chaunskaya Bay or Chaun Bay is an Arctic bay in the East Siberian Sea, in the Chaunsky District of Chukotka, northeast Siberia. There is Port of Pevek.

Geography
The bay is open to the north and is 140 km in length. Its maximum width is 110 km. Its mouth is defined by Cape Shelagsky, the end of the Shelag Range, to the east and an unnamed part of Ayon Island to the west. It narrows where the Pevek Peninsula on the east approaches Ayon Island.

Owing to is northerly location Chaunskaya Bay is covered with ice most of the year.

This bay is the center of one of the larger lowlands in Chukotka. A number of rivers flow into the southeastern corner: Chaun River, Ichuveyem River, Palyavaam River, Lelyuveyem River and Pucheveyem River. There is a protected natural area in the southeast.
Lake Elgygytgyn is about 160 km southeast and the town of Bilibino about 160 km southwest.

History
The first Russian to reach the area was probably Mikhail Stadukhin in 1649.

References

All locations
Lemmings

Bays of Chukotka Autonomous Okrug
Bays of the East Siberian Sea